The 1966–67 SK Rapid Wien season was the 69th season in club history.

Squad

Squad and statistics

Squad statistics

Fixtures and results

League

Cup

Cup Winners' Cup

References

1966-67 Rapid Wien Season
Rapid
Austrian football championship-winning seasons